"Reinforce Love" is a charity single, released by Blue member Lee Ryan in November 2007. The single was released for the cancer charity CLIC Sargent. The single was released on 10 December 2007. The track did not receive any airplay on British radio stations, and did not appear in any BBC Radio playlists, resulting in a very low chart position. The single was a commercial failure in the United Kingdom, peaking at #101 on the UK Singles Chart, becoming the worst position in Lee's career, and the worst peak position for a former Blue member. Due to the lack of success, the single was not released in Europe. The video was released at the beginning of November 2007.

Track listing
 UK CD single
 "Reinforce Love" (Single Edit) – 4:03
 "Reinforce Love" (Fugitive's Full Strength Mix) – 5:27
 "Reinforce Love" (K-Gee's Reggae Bounce Mix) – 4:08
 "Reinforce Love" (K-Gee's Reggae Bounce Instrumental) – 4:08
 "Reinforce Love" (Video) – 4:15

 Digital download
 "Reinforce Love" (Single Edit) – 4:03
 "Reinforce Love" (Fugitive's Full Strength Mix) – 5:27
 "Reinforce Love" (K-Gee's Reggae Bounce Mix) – 4:08
 "Reinforce Love" (K-Gee's Reggae Bounce Instrumental) – 4:08

Charts

References

2007 singles
Lee Ryan songs
Songs written by Lee Ryan
2007 songs